Dale Gavin Sabbagh (born 2 February 1991) is a South African rugby union player, currently playing with Border Super League side Old Selbornians. His regular position is fly-half or full-back.

Career

Youth
In 2010, he joined the  where he played in the 2010 Under-19 Provincial Championship competition.

Senior career
He was named in the ' squad for the 2011 Vodacom Cup, but failed to make an appearance. He made his senior first class debut in the 2011 Currie Cup Compulsory Friendlies match against , kicking 5 points. He made a further nine appearances in the 2011 Currie Cup First Division, scoring 47 points and finishing as the ' second top scorer behind Ntabeni Dukisa and joint twelfth overall.

In 2012, he made just one Vodacom Cup appearance and reverted to playing with the Under-21 team in the 2012 Under-21 Provincial Championship. He scored 81 points during the season, placing him eighth overall.

He was again involved in the ' 2013 Vodacom Cup campaign, appearing in three games.

References

1991 births
Living people
Border Bulldogs players
Rugby union players from East London, Eastern Cape
South African rugby union players
Rugby union fly-halves